Sir Thomas Parry (1541 – 30 May 1616) was an English politician and diplomat during the Tudor period.

He was the son of Sir Thomas Parry Senior of Welford Park in Berkshire, the Controller of the Royal Household, by his wife, Anne, the daughter of Sir William Reade of Boarstall in Buckinghamshire. He was educated at Winchester School (1558).

He first entered Parliament in 1571 as member for Bridport. He was appointed High Sheriff of Berkshire for 1575–76 and 1587–88 and made a deputy lieutenant for Berkshire in 1593.

From 1586 to 1587, during the reign of Elizabeth I of England, he was the Member of Parliament for Berkshire. and for St Albans in 1610.

In 1601, he was knighted and appointed English ambassador to France for four years. Upon his return to England, he was made Chancellor of the Duchy of Lancaster. In 1614 he was again reelected to Parliament for Berkshire but, after being censured for interference in the election at Stockbridge, was dismissed from the House. He also temporarily lost his position as Chancellor of the Duchy of Lancaster.

He died intestate in 1616 at his home, Hamstead Marshall House, and was buried in Westminster Abbey. He had married Dorothy Brooke of Bristol, maid of honour to the Queen; they had no children.

References

1541 births
1616 deaths
People from Hamstead Marshall
People educated at Winchester College
Members of the Parliament of England for Berkshire
English MPs 1571
Ambassadors of England to France
Burials at Westminster Abbey
Chancellors of the Duchy of Lancaster
Thomas
English MPs 1586–1587
English MPs 1604–1611
English MPs 1614
17th-century English diplomats
High Sheriffs of Berkshire
Deputy Lieutenants of Berkshire